The 1973 UCI Track Cycling World Championships were the World Championship for track cycling. They took place in San Sebastián, Spain from 22 to 28 August 1973. Eleven events were contested, 9 for men (3 for professionals, 6 for amateurs) and 2 for women.

Medal summary

Medal table

See also
 1973 UCI Road World Championships

References

Track cycling
UCI Track Cycling World Championships by year
International cycle races hosted by Spain
1973 in track cycling